Udayarpalayam is a panchayat town in the Ariyalur district of the Indian state of Tamil Nadu, near Jayankondam.

Demographics
As of the 2001 India census, Udayarpalayam has a population of 11,325. Males constitute 51% of the population and females constitute 49%. Udayarpalayam has an average literacy rate of 62%, higher than the national average of 59.5%: male literacy rate is 73%, and female literacy rate is 52%. In Udayarpalayam, 13% of the population is under 6 years of age.

Udayarpalayam was constituted as a village panchayat in 1886. Through a government order, dated 7 July 2006, the town was upgraded as a grade-one town panchayat. Udayarpalayam's town panchayat is divided into 15 wards and representatives from each ward constitute the council. The town administration is governed by an Executive Officer of Town Panchayat; Jayankondam Being the headquarters of Udayarpalayam Taluk.

More informatiom
Udayarpalayam was ruled by many kings in the history such as Early Cholas, Kalabhras, Pallavas, Medieval Cholas, Later Cholas, Later Pandyas, Delhi Sultanate, Madurai Sultanate, Vijayanagar Empire, Thanjavur Nayaks, Thanjavur Marathas, and British Raj.

It has many government and private schools and education institutes also.

The main occupations of this town is agricultural, fishing, and hand looms

The soil type found here is predominantly while red loam, clay loam & black cotton varieties are widely common in the outer edge of the city.

The major crop is paddy rice; other crops include millet, legumes, oil seed, sugarcane and cotton.

Its temperatures in summer reaches, 40 C max. & 26.3 C min., although temperatures more than 42 C are very common. Winter temperatures lie from 29.6 C to 18 C.

History
The zaminadiri system existed still 1956, Chinnanalla Udayar, was the last Zamindar, who ruled till 1956. Even now their successors are found in the town. The town has a large palace and a temple and temple tank within its premises.

Location
Udayarpalayam is 255 km from Chennai.

On the south around 29 km from kumbakonam via Neelathanallur-Mathanathur bridge.

On the east and 30 km from Ariyalur.

On the North 33 km from Srimueshnam. On the North and 44 km from Viruthachalam.

On the east and 58 km from away Chidambaram.

Udayarpalayam Town limit extends over an area of 12 km2.

Locational Advantage

Udayarpalayam town is located at a distance of 45 km from the district headquarters on the State Highway (SH 4), which runs form Tiruchirappalli to Chidambaram.

The town is located at a distance of 85 km on the north eastern side of Tiruchirappalli.

The other towns of the region namely, Ariyalur, Virudhachalam, Kumbakonam, Tanjore and Perambalur are located within a distance of 50 km from the town and are well connected by state and private run buses.

The town is also connected to all the parts of the state.  Ariyalur is the nearest railway station and is 28 km from the town.

Tourism Importance
As far as tourism potential of the town is concerned, the historic monuments and the heritage elements which are to be utilized to optimum levels and included in the tourist circuit of the region.

The palace and the Payarneeshwarar temple are the major attractions of the town. Payarneeshwarar temple is one of the oldest Shiva temples in the state, dating back to 1400 years, quite older than Thanjavur Prahadeeshwarar temple.

There are large numbers of tourist places, namely Gangaikonda Chozhapuram, Chidambaram; Thanjavur etc., located within a radius of 100 km of the town.

Nearby cities and towns

Gangaikonda cholapuram
Jayamkondam
Kallankurichi

References 

Cities and towns in Ariyalur district